Anton Volodymyrovych Kovalevski (born 9 March 1985 in Kiev) is a Ukrainian former competitive figure skater. He won medals at the Crystal Skate of Romania, Golden Spin of Zagreb, Ice Challenge, and Ondrej Nepela Memorial, and is a four-time (2006–07, 2009–10) Ukrainian national champion. He decided to take a break from competitive skating after the 2010-11 season.

Programs

Competitive highlights
GP: Grand Prix; JGP: Junior Grand Prix

References

External links

 
 

Ukrainian male single skaters
Figure skaters at the 2006 Winter Olympics
Olympic figure skaters of Ukraine
Figure skaters at the 2010 Winter Olympics
1985 births
Living people
Sportspeople from Kyiv
Competitors at the 2003 Winter Universiade
Competitors at the 2005 Winter Universiade